Thandalam may refer to several places in India:

 Thandalam, Chennai, Tamil Nadu (perhaps the commonest meaning)
 Thandalam, Thiruvananthapuram, Kerala
 Thandalam, Thanjavur, Tamil Nadu